Höfen is a former municipality in the administrative district of Thun in the canton of Bern in Switzerland.  On 1 January 2014 the former municipalities of Höfen, Niederstocken and Oberstocken merged into the new municipality of Stocken-Höfen.

Geography

Of this area,  or 74.2% is used for agricultural purposes, while  or 16.1% is forested.

Of the built up area, housing and buildings made up 2.8% and transportation infrastructure made up 2.8%.  14.5% of the total land area is heavily forested and 1.5% is covered with orchards or small clusters of trees.  Of the agricultural land, 23.9% is used for growing crops and 48.2% is pastures, while 2.2% is used for orchards or vine crops.  All the water in the municipality is in lakes.  Of the unproductive areas, 1.7% is unproductive vegetation.

The lake Uebeschisee is located partially in the former municipality.

Demographics
Höfen had a population (as of 2011) of 444.  , 2.1% of the population was made up of foreign nationals.  Over the last 10 years the population has decreased at a rate of -3.5%.  Most of the population speaks German  (98.7%), with French being second most common ( 0.3%) and Rhaeto-romance being third ( 0.3%).

In the 2007 election the most popular party was the SVP which received 49.6% of the vote.  The next three most popular parties were the Green Party (12.3%), the SPS (11.6%) and the local small left-wing parties (10.7%).

The age distribution of the population is children and teenagers (0–19 years old) make up 29.4% of the population, while adults (20–64 years old) make up 59.3% and seniors (over 64 years old) make up 11.3%.  The entire Swiss population is generally well educated.  In Höfen about 77.7% of the population (between age 25-64) have completed either non-mandatory upper secondary education or additional higher education (either university or a Fachhochschule).

Höfen has an unemployment rate of 0.92%.  , there were 65 people employed in the primary economic sector and about 26 businesses involved in this sector.  9 people are employed in the secondary sector and there are 3 businesses in this sector.  56 people are employed in the tertiary sector, with 10 businesses in this sector.
The historical population is given in the following table:

References

External links 
 Official website of the municipality in 

Former municipalities of the canton of Bern